The 2009 Spanish GP2 round was a GP2 Series motor race held on May 9 and May 10, 2009 at the Circuit de Catalunya in Montmeló, Spain. It was the first race of the 2009 GP2 Season. The race was used to support the 2009 Spanish Grand Prix

Report 
The first race resulted in a one-two finish for Barwa Addax Team drivers Romain Grosjean and Vitaly Petrov, with Jérôme d'Ambrosio finishing third for DAMS.

The second race was won by Edoardo Mortara for Telmex Arden International, with Romain Grosjean and Jérôme d'Ambrosio also on the podium. Mortara finished sixth in his first race, so was automatically on Pole for race 2. He wins in his first ever GP2 Weekend.

Classification

Qualifying 

Notes
 – Luca Filippi was handed a 3-place grid penalty for failing to sufficiently heed yellow flags during free practice.
 – Javier Villa was handed a 3-place grid penalty for failing to sufficiently heed yellow flags during free practice.

Race 1

Race 2

Standings after the round 

Drivers' Championship standings

Teams' Championship standings

 Note: Only the top five positions are included for both sets of standings.

References

External links
 http://www.autosport.com/news/report.php/id/75190
 https://web.archive.org/web/20090517084521/http://www.gp2series.com/en/website/2009gp2series/news/newsgp2/newsdetail.php?articleid=2309
 https://web.archive.org/web/20120929185910/http://www.f1sa.com/index.php?option=com_content&view=article&id=13231:gp2--2009-spain-qualifying-report-a-results-romain-grosjean-storms-to-pole&catid=18:gp2&Itemid=132

Catalunya
Catalunya GP2